Arthur Lemarcus "Marcus" Banks III (born November 19, 1981) is an American former professional basketball player.

He played college basketball at the UNLV with the Runnin' Rebels, where he was Co-Defensive Player of the Year as a senior. He was selected with the thirteenth pick in the first round of the 2003 NBA draft by the Memphis Grizzlies, then traded to the Boston Celtics, along with Kendrick Perkins.

College career
After playing two years at Dixie College, a junior college in St. George, Utah, Banks transferred to UNLV. He played for the UNLV Runnin' Rebels, where he was Co-Defensive Player of the Year of the Mountain West Conference as a senior.

Professional career

NBA
Banks was selected as the thirteenth pick in the first round of the 2003 NBA draft by the Memphis Grizzlies; however, he was then traded to the Boston Celtics along with Kendrick Perkins. He was traded to the Los Angeles Lakers in 2004 for Gary Payton, but returned to Boston after the trade was amended following Payton's refusal to take a physical. In Boston, Banks was known for his good defense and ball handling; Allen Iverson, a division-rival point guard, named Banks as the toughest defender he faced in his career. Coach Doc Rivers had high hopes for rookie Delonte West, who also played point guard. 

On January 26, 2006, it was announced that Banks, Mark Blount, Ricky Davis and Justin Reed were traded to the Minnesota Timberwolves for Wally Szczerbiak, Michael Olowokandi and Dwayne Jones.

Banks signed as a free agent with the Phoenix Suns on July 19, 2006.

In 2007, the Suns spent training camp working Banks into a shooting-guard role when they were not seeking a trade, a tough proposition with Banks in the second year of a five-year, $21.3 million contract.

On February 6, 2008, Banks, along with All-Star forward Shawn Marion, was traded to the Miami Heat for Shaquille O'Neal.

On February 13, 2009, Marcus Banks was traded to the Toronto Raptors with Shawn Marion in exchange for Jermaine O'Neal and Jamario Moon.

On November 20, 2010, Banks was traded to the New Orleans Hornets with Jarrett Jack and David Andersen for Peja Stojaković and Jerryd Bayless. In his 5½-month tenure with the Hornets, Banks never played a game for the team. Thus, Banks' final game in the NBA was during his time with the Raptors on November 16th, 2010 in a 94 - 109 loss to the Washington Wizards. In his final game, Banks recorded 2 points and 2 assists.

Overseas
On November 12, 2012, Banks was acquired by the Greek League club Panathinaikos Athens. He was released in May 2013.

NBA career statistics

Regular season

|-
| align="left" | 
| align="left" | Boston
| 81 || 2 || 17.1 || .400 || .314 || .756 || 1.6 || 2.2 || 1.1 || .2 || 5.9
|-
| align="left" | 
| align="left" | Boston
| 81 || 2 || 14.1 || .402 || .356 || .742 || 1.6 || 1.9 || .8 || .2 || 4.6
|-
| align="left" | 
| align="left" | Boston
| 18 || 1 || 14.9 || .413 || .316 || .900 || 1.1 || 1.8 || .4 || .0 || 5.5
|-
| align="left" | 
| align="left" | Minnesota
| 40 || 28 || 30.7 || .479 || .364 || .778 || 2.9 || 4.7 || 1.2 || .3 || 12.0
|-
| align="left" | 
| align="left" | Phoenix
| 45 || 1 || 11.2 || .429 || .172 || .800 || .8 || 1.3 || .5 || .1 || 4.9
|-
| align="left" | 
| align="left" | Phoenix
| 24 || 1 || 12.9 || .404 || .385 || .750 || .8 || 1.0 || .3 || .3 || 5.2
|-
| align="left" | 
| align="left" | Miami
| 12 || 2 || 21.6 || .512 || .405 || .789 || 2.1 || 3.0 || .5 || .4 || 9.5
|-
| align="left" | 
| align="left" | Miami
| 16 || 0 || 10.4 || .385 || .143 || .667 || .9 || 1.4 || .6 || .1 || 2.6
|-
| align="left" | 
| align="left" | Toronto
| 6 || 0 || 6.7 || .333 || .200 || .333 || .5 || 1.0 || .2 || .0 || 2.3
|-
| align="left" | 
| align="left" | Toronto
| 22 || 0 || 11.1 || .534 || .292 || .828 || 1.0 || 1.2 || .5 || .1 || 5.0
|-
| align="left" | 
| align="left" | Toronto
| 3 || 0 || 7.3 || .000 || .000 || .750 || .3 || 1.0 || .3 || .0 || 2.0
|- class="sortbottom"
| style="text-align:center;" colspan="2"| Career
| 348 || 37 || 16.0 || .432 || .327 || .768 || 1.5 || 2.1 || .8 || .2 || 5.9

Playoffs

|-
| align="left" | 2004
| align="left" | Boston
| 4 || 0 || 15.0 || .438 || .400 || 1.000 || 1.8 || 1.8 || .5 || .3 || 5.0
|-
| align="left" | 2005
| align="left" | Boston
| 7 || 0 || 15.1 || .448 || .500 || .500 || 1.6 || 1.0 || .6 || .0 || 4.6
|-
| align="left" | 2007
| align="left" | Phoenix
| 2 || 0 || 3.5 || .000 || .000 || 1.000 || .0 || .5 || .0 || .0 || 1.0
|- class="sortbottom"
| style="text-align:center;" colspan="2"| Career
| 13 || 0 || 13.3 || .426 || .417 || .750 || 1.4 || 1.2 || .5 || .1 || 4.2

References

External links

Euroleague.net Profile
Eurobasket.com Profile

1981 births
Living people
American expatriate basketball people in Canada
American expatriate basketball people in France
American expatriate basketball people in Greece
American expatriate basketball people in Lebanon
American expatriate basketball people in Qatar
Basketball players from Nevada
Boston Celtics players
Utah Tech Trailblazers men's basketball players
Junior college men's basketball players in the United States
Memphis Grizzlies draft picks
Miami Heat players
Minnesota Timberwolves players
Panathinaikos B.C. players
Phoenix Suns players
Point guards
SLUC Nancy Basket players
Sportspeople from Las Vegas
Toronto Raptors players
UNLV Runnin' Rebels basketball players
Big3 players
American men's basketball players
Al-Gharafa SC basketball players
American men's 3x3 basketball players